Alessandro Nocco (born 20 May 1997) is an Italian motorcycle racer. He currently competes in the CIV Supersport 600 Championship aboard a Kawasaki ZX-6R. At international level he has competed in the European Superstock 600 Championship, where he was the runner-up in 2013, the Supersport World Championship, the European Superstock 1000 Championship and the Moto2 World Championship.

Career statistics

Supersport World Championship

Races by year

Grand Prix motorcycle racing

By season

Races by year

References

External links

Living people
Italian motorcycle racers
Moto2 World Championship riders
1997 births
Supersport World Championship riders
FIM Superstock 1000 Cup riders
Sportspeople from the Province of Lecce
21st-century Italian people